Thakor is a subcaste of Koli community of Gujarat. Koli forms the largest caste-cluster, comprising 24% of the total population of the state. Koli Thakors in Gujarat placed in Other Backward Class including all of the Koli Community of state during the power of former Koli chief minister Madhav Singh Solanki. Koli Thakors are mostly businessmen or land-owners.

Clans 
Some of the clans of Koli Thakors are here
Makwana
Parmar
Solanki
Jhala
Chauhan
Vaghela

Organisation 

 Kshatriya Koli Thakor Samaj
 Sree Smasth Chunvalia Koli Thakor Velnath Pragati Mandal
 Chunvalia Koli Thakor Seva Trust, Surendranagar

Notable Thakor 
 Alpesh Thakor, Member of legislative assembly from Radhanpur
 Geni Thakor, Member of legislative assembly
Jagdish Thakor, Gujarat Congress President
Vikram Thakor

See also 
 List of Koli people
 List of Koli states and clans

References 

Koli people
Caste system in India
Indian castes

Koli subcastes
Koli titles